Delaney is an unincorporated community in Madison County, in the U.S. state of Arkansas.

History
In the 1880s, Delaney developed as lumber trading center. A post office called Delaney was established in 1878, and remained in operation until 1966.

References

Unincorporated communities in Madison County, Arkansas